Tallemant may refer to:

François Tallemant l'Aîné
Gédéon Tallemant des Réaux (1619-1692), French writer